Opekta, also known as Gies & Co., was a European pectin and spice company that existed between 1928 and 1995.  It is notable for its Dutch operation being based in the building at  that would later become the Anne Frank House.  Opekta started in Germany and later expanded into the Netherlands in 1933, at which time Otto Frank moved from Germany to Amsterdam to become managing director of the new Dutch operation.  Otto Frank was in charge of the manufacturing and distribution of the pectin-based gelling preparations, to be used in jam making.  

The company continued to trade from the same building while Otto Frank, his family (including his youngest daughter Anne Frank) and several other Jews hid from persecution stemming from the Nazi Occupation of the Netherlands during World War II.

History

The Opekta company was originally based in Cologne, Germany, being founded and owned by Austrian chemists Robert Feix and Richard Fackeldey.  In 1933 the German businessman Otto Frank, then still residing in Germany, was appointed to aid their expansion into the Netherlands. Frank had already considered moving his family to the Netherlands following the election of Adolf Hitler and the rise of Nazism, so he accepted the post and moved alone to Amsterdam to find premises for the company. He had briefly managed a large rival firm, Pomosin, which traded pectin to factories from the Dutch town of Utrecht but decided that retail trade would be more lucrative in the Dutch market than wholesale. His franchise for the Amsterdam branch of Opekta was established in September 1933. In December 1933 his wife Edith Frank-Holländer found an apartment for the family on Merwedeplein, in the southern part of Amsterdam. 

Victor Kugler, an ex-colleague from Pomosin, came on board almost immediately to help run the company. The workforce was small; apart from a junior clerk, the only other employee was a secretary, who left a few months after the company started trading. She was replaced by Miep Gies, whose duties extended from the secretarial, to public relations and advertising. In 1938, she appeared in a promotional film to promote the Opekta product, which was used to demonstrate to consumers how easy it was to use in cooking. That year, they were joined by two other employees, Hermann van Pels as an herb specialist and Johannes Kleiman as a bookkeeper. Bep Voskuijl, who had been the administration manager when war broke out, had been taken on in the previous year, 1937.

After the arrival of the German occupiers in 1940, the company was re-registered under the name of Victor Kugler to prevent it from being confiscated as a Jewish-owned business. Otto Frank still remained in charge, but in secret. The company was renamed to Gies & Co. Otto Frank had to resign in December 1941 at the point at which Otto Frank and Hermann van Pels and their families were forced into hiding in the upper rear rooms of the building in July 1942, but continued to act as a silent partner in the company. Their two-year confinement, which was aided by Kleiman, Kugler, Gies and Voskuijl, was famously chronicled by Otto Frank's youngest daughter, Anne, in an autobiographical work, The Diary of a Young Girl, published in 1947.

Otto Frank retired as director of Opekta in 1953 and was succeeded by Johannes Kleiman, until Kleiman's death in 1959. By this time, Anne Frank's diary had drawn readers to visit the premises and a successful campaign saved the building from demolition. Opekta left the building in 1955 and five years later it re-opened as the Anne Frank House, a museum dedicated to the life and writings of Anne Frank.

The company was acquired by Dr. Oetker in August 1995.

Sources

External links 
Otto Frank's businesses on the Anne Frank web site

Anne Frank
Companies based in Amsterdam
Manufacturing companies based in Cologne
Food and drink companies established in 1928
1928 establishments in Germany
Food and drink companies disestablished in 1995
1995 mergers and acquisitions